The women's light heavyweight (65 kg/143 lbs) Thai-Boxing division at the W.A.K.O. European Championships 2004 in Budva was the heaviest of the female Thai-Boxing tournaments and involved just three fighters.  Each of the matches was three rounds of two minutes each and were fought under Thai-Boxing rules.

The tournament winner was Nadine Dinkler from Germany who defeated Olga Kokorina from Russia by unanimous decision to claim gold.  Milanka Kragovic from Serbia and Montenegro claimed bronze.

Results

Key

See also
List of WAKO Amateur European Championships
List of WAKO Amateur World Championships
List of female kickboxers

References

External links
 WAKO World Association of Kickboxing Organizations Official Site

W.A.K.O. European Championships 2004 (Budva)